Willis Deon Plaza (born 3 August 1987), is a Trinidadian professional footballer who plays as a forward for Indian club Bhawanipore.

Club career

Early years
In his early career, Plaza played club football in Trinidad and Vietnam for San Juan Jabloteh, Navibank Sài Gòn and Sông Lam Nghệ An, Central FC. In July 2014 he signed for Belgian club Visé.

In December 2015, Plaza signed a deal to join Salvadoran Primera División side Alianza in January 2016. In 2016, he returned to San Juan Jabloteh.

East Bengal 
In January 2017, Plaza signed for Indian I-League club East Bengal. On 14 January, he scored his first goal for the club, scoring the winning goal in the 80th minute of a 2–1 victory against DSK Shivajians.

On 4 July 2017, it was announced that the club had retained Plaza for the upcoming season. In January 2018, he  was released by the club.

Mohammedan/Churchill Brothers
It was announced that Willis would sign for Mohammedan from 8 February 2018. He then moved to Churchill Brothers in March 2018. He won the golden boot of the 2018–19 I-League season, with 21 goals.

He scored a brace for Churchill in their Indian Super Cup qualifier against Delhi Dynamos and helped his side to advance in to the final round of the tournament. Later he was included in Churchill's squad for remaining matches of the Goa Professional League.

He was retained by Churchill Brothers for the 2019 season. In April 2019 he moved on loan to Bashundhara Kings.

In July 2020, he returned to Mohammedan.

Delhi FC
In August 2021, he signed with Minerva Delhi FC and appeared in the 130th edition of Durand Cup. Plaza later appeared in the 2021 I-League Qualifiers, in which they finished on third position.

Aizawl
On 25 November 2021, Plaza moved to Aizawl FC, ahead of the 2021–22 I-League season.

Bhawanipore
He signed for Bhawanipore in June 2022. He helped his team winning Naihati Gold Cup with scoring a brace in their 4–0 win against United Sports.

International career
He made his international debut for Trinidad and Tobago on 22 January 2012.

Personal life
Plaza has said that his ancestors lived in the southern part of the Indian city of Kolkata. During his school days, Plaza played cricket and was a friend of West Indian international Sunil Narine. In an interview, he said that Narine was his close friend and both of them idolised Brian Lara. He also said that he started playing football on the advice of his coach.

Career statistics

International

Statistics accurate as of match played 3 June 2016

International goals
As of match played 3 June 2016. Trinidad & Tobago score listed first, score column indicates score after each Plaza goal.

Honours
Bhawanipore
Naihati Gold Cup: 2022
CFL Premier Division A runner-up: 2022

Individual
 I-League Golden Boot: 2018–19 (with 21 goals)

References

External links
 
 

1987 births
Living people
Trinidad and Tobago footballers
Trinidad and Tobago international footballers
Trinidad and Tobago expatriate footballers
Trinidad and Tobago expatriate sportspeople in Vietnam
Expatriate footballers in Vietnam
Trinidad and Tobago expatriate sportspeople in India
Expatriate footballers in India
TT Pro League players
Central F.C. players
Trinidad and Tobago expatriate sportspeople in Belgium
Expatriate footballers in Belgium
Song Lam Nghe An FC players
C.S. Visé players
East Bengal Club players
V.League 1 players
2015 CONCACAF Gold Cup players
Navibank Sài Gòn FC players
Association football forwards
Bashundhara Kings players
Trinidad and Tobago expatriates in Bangladesh
Expatriate footballers in Bangladesh
Calcutta Football League players
Aizawl FC players
Bhawanipore FC players